Psalm 83 is the 83rd psalm of the biblical Book of Psalms. In the slightly different numbering system used in the Greek Septuagint and Latin Vulgate translations of the Bible, this psalm is Psalm 82.

This psalm is the last of the Psalms of Asaph, which include Psalms 50 and 73 to 83. It is also the last of the "Elohist" collection, Psalms 42–83, in which the one of God's titles, Elohim, is mainly used. It is generally seen as a national lament provoked by the threat of an invasion of Israel by its neighbors.

Analysis
The psalm has been seen by some commentators as being purely cultic in nature. Others have indicated that the specific naming of particular nations indicates that it does refer to a specific historical period, even though the prayer itself would be offered in the Temple in Jerusalem. The dating of its composition is debated, but the reference in verse 9 to Assyria is seen by many commentators as an indication that the Psalm was written during the time of Assyrian ascendancy, the 9th to 7th centuries BC. Others  have placed the composition of the psalm from the time of Saul onwards, up to the age of the Maccabees, suggested by Theodore of Mopsuestia.

Verses

Verse 1
Do not keep silent, O God!
Do not hold Your peace,
And do not be still, O God!
The specific meaning of this verse is disputed. The verb can be translated to refer to either speech ("be not silent") or motion ("be not inactive"). The fact that the verse requests the assistance of God three times emphasizes the urgency of the situation and of the people's prayer.

Verses 2–5
In the text of the psalm, specifically verses 2 through 5, the speaker makes the assumption that individuals who plot against the nation of Israel must inherently be enemies of God. He also ascribes to them the intention of the complete extinction of the people of Israel, as that is the meaning of verse 4, which indicates that the name of Israel will be obliterated or remembered no more.

Verses 6–8
These verses provide the names of the ten nations which have evidently formed a coalition against Israel, the Edomites, the Ishmaelites, Moab, the Hagrites, Gebal, Ammon, Amalek, the Philistines, Tyre, and Assyria.

Verses 9–12
The narrator goes on to assume that God himself will fight on Israel's side in the upcoming battle, based on the stories contained in the 4th through 8th chapters of the Book of Judges, citing individual actions attributed to God in that book.

Verses 13–17
In these verses, the narrator specifically requests that God make the opponents of Israel suffer and experience shame and die in disgrace for opposing Israel, and, by extension, God himself. The specifics mentioned, including chaff, fire and storm, are references to the Sirocco.

Verse 18

In this verse, the narrator states that he wishes God perform these various acts so that all might know that God is the most powerful entity and has sway over all the Earth. This verse, with verse 16, indicates that, although the bulk of the psalm is a prayer for the destruction of the enemies of Israel, there is some positive hope that the enemies of Israel might come to acknowledge the god of Israel.
While the King James Version most often translates the tetragrammaton-YHWH (which occurs in the Hebrew scriptures 6,828 times) as "LORD", this verse has one of the several occurrences in which it is translated as "JEHOVAH". This translation renders those four letters, known as the Tetragrammaton, "Jehovah". That name is by far the most frequently occurring name in the Bible. It is one of the few verses where the phrases "whose name is" or "that is my name" are used (Isa 42:8, Jer 33:2, etc.) in the whole Bible. Notably, for these reasons this particular verse in the King James Bible is widely quoted, particularly by Jehovah's Witnesses, as evidence that "Jehovah" is the personal name of God.

Different translations interpret the verse as follows:

Book of Common Prayer
In the Church of England's Book of Common Prayer, this psalm is appointed to be read in the evening of the 16th day of the month.

See also
 Ezekiel 38 and 39, a passage that describes a similar war
 List of bible names beginning with  "Jeho."

References

External links 

  in Hebrew and English – Mechon-mamre
  King James Bible – Wikisource
 Bibelarchiv-Vegelahn
 BibleGateway

083
Phoenicians in the Hebrew Bible
Ishmaelites